New London is an unincorporated community in Caroline County, in the U.S. state of Virginia.  It lies within Fort A. P. Hill, 6 miles north-northeast of Bowling Green, Virginia.

References

  

Unincorporated communities in Virginia
Unincorporated communities in Caroline County, Virginia